Behind the Footlights is a 1956 Soviet comedy drama film directed by Konstantin Yudin.

Plot 
The film tells about an elderly actor and his beautiful and gifted daughter, who dreams of becoming an actress and playing in the theater.

Cast 
 Vasili Merkuryev as Lev Gurych Sinichkin (as V. Merkuryev)
 Liliya Yudina as Liza - Sinichkin daughter (as L. Yudina)
 Tatyana Karpova as Surmilova, actress (as T. Karpova)
 Nikolai Afanasyev as Prince Vetrinsky (as N. Afanasyev)
 Mikhail Yanshin as Borzikov, dramatist (as M. Yanshin)
 Yuri Lyubimov as Prince Zefirov (as Yu. Lyubimov)
 Sergei Blinnikov as Pustoslavtsev, theatre keeper (as S. Blinnikov)
 Stanislav Chekan as Stepan, coachman (as S. Chekan)
 Aleksandr Sashin-Nikolsky as Prompter (as A. Samin-Nikolsky)
 Yelena Savitskaya
 Irina Fyodorova
 Grigori Abrikosov
 Pyotr Repnin
 Yury Yakovlev as Chakhotkin (as Yu. Yakovlev)
 Nikolay Kutuzov
 V. Troshuk

References

External links 
 

1956 films
Soviet comedy-drama films
1950s Russian-language films
1956 comedy-drama films
Soviet black-and-white films